Rajvinder Kaur Gill was a Canadian banker who disappeared in late August 2012, while on a trip to Pakistan.
According to the Pakistani newspaper The Nation, Gill possessed over $5 million USD at the time of her disappearance.

Immigration to Canada and career as a banker

According to Gill's family, they immigrated to Canada in 1999.
Gill had worked for the Canadian Imperial Bank of Commerce until 2006, when she moved to Switzerland and worked for merchant bank firms Merrill Lynch, UBS and EFG Bank.

Newspapers from Pakistan identify Gill as a member of the Sikh religion.

According to her sister, Gill had been participating on an online dating service, called Shaadi.com, and the real purpose of her trip was to meet one or more of her online romantic interests for the first time.

Gill was reported to have resigned her job shortly before her fatal trip.

Fatal trip

Gill applied for a visa to Pakistan from Dubai on August 12, 2012.

Accounts of the purpose of her trip differed. 
Some accounts said she had traveled to Pakistan to settle a long-standing debt.
Other accounts said she was attending a conference.
Yet another account said the purpose of her trip was her first in-person meeting with a romantic interest she met online.
And yet another account said the purpose of her trip was to look for and purchase precious gemstones.

Gill flew into Lahore on August 25, 2012.

Disappearance

Gill's family reported that they received text messages from Gill, when she arrived in Pakistan, and on the 26th and 27th. 
When they provided her cell phone records to the authorities, they show that the last message she sent was to the Pakistani television personality she had met through the online dating site.

However, several reports of the confession of one of the suspects in her murders have him describing picking Gill up at Lahore's airport, and driving her directly to the kill-site on August 25.

Tribune India reported she disappeared on August 31, after staying in three separate hotels, and after meeting with "some unidentified people".

Her family's attempt to have her disappearance investigated

Gill's family reported her disappearance to Canadian officials, and they did their best to report her disappearance to Pakistani officials from Canada.
Eventually, her father traveled to Pakistan so that he could make sure a satisfactory inquiry was conducted.
According to the Express Tribune, Assistant Advocate General Arib Yaqoob filed a report with magistrates on December 6, 2012, which said that Gill was still not officially considered "missing".

On November 17, 2012, the Tribune India reported that Pakistan was going to initiate an inquiry, after Gill's father Sikandar Singh requested help from Indian Punjab's Deputy Chief Minister Sukhbir Singh Badal—a distant relative.

On November 29, 2012, Tribune India quoted a police official to the effect that "the possibility of Rajvinder being in the custody of intelligence agencies could not be ruled out."

Hafiz Shahzad Hussain's confession

Pakistani officials have two suspects, cousins Hafiz Shahzad Hussain and Shahid Ghazanfar.
Hafiz was apprehended and interrogated by Pakistan's Intelligence Bureau, and is reported to have given an account of her murder. According to the Pakistani officials, in that confession his cousin Shahid owed Gill a large sum of money, and offered to pay him for help killing her. He confessed they lured her on a car trip to view gems, where Shahid first covertly served Gill tea laced with a sedative, so she wouldn't struggle, and then strangled her. He confessed to helping dump her body in a rural canal.

Hafiz had Gill's laptop when he was apprehended.
Cousin Shahid, the naturalized German citizen, was reported to have escaped to Germany.

Search for Shahid Ghazanfar

On January 7, 2013, the Lahore High Court directed Pakistani police to call upon Interpol to seek out and arrest Shahid.
The High Court directed Pakistani police to request Canada and Switzerland to freeze Gill's bank accounts.

The police confirmed that one of Shahid's aliases was Karishna Roy.

As of March 1, 2013, Krishna Rio alias Shahid Ghaznafar is in German Police custody, and German police have taken over lead investigation on the case. Their team is going to Pakistan for further investigation.

Current status
In 2017, a Pakistani court acquitted Hafiz Shahzad, accused of killing her, due to lack of evidence against him.

References

Canadian bankers
1971 births
2012 deaths
People from Punjab, India
Indian emigrants to Canada
Canadian people murdered abroad
People murdered in Punjab, Pakistan
Punjabi people
Foreign hostages in Pakistan
Canada–Pakistan relations
Indian people murdered abroad